This is a list of postsecondary educational institutions affiliated with the Assemblies of God.

North America

Bahamas
Assemblies of God Bible College, Nassau, Bahamas

Canada
There are nine bible colleges affiliated with the Pentecostal Assemblies of Canada.

Summit Pacific College, Abbotsford, British Columbia
Vanguard College, Edmonton, Alberta
Horizon College and Seminary, Saskatoon, Saskatchewan
Master's College and Seminary, Peterborough, Ontario, Ontario
Aboriginal Bible Academy, Deseronto, Ontario
Global University Canada, Toronto, Ontario
Institut biblique du Québec, Longueuil, Quebec

Jamaica
Assemblies of God Bible College, Christiana, Jamaica

Puerto Rico
Caribbean Theological College, Bayamón, Puerto Rico (A.A., B.A.)

United States
In the United States, AG schools are affiliated with the Assemblies of God USA.

Bible and theological
Latin American Bible Institute, California, La Puente, California
Christ Mission College (formerly Latin American Bible Institute) Texas, San Antonio, Texas
Native American Bible College, Shannon, North Carolina (B.R.E.)
Northpoint Bible College, Haverhill, Massachusetts (A.A., B.A., M.A.) (A.B.H.E., Professional Accreditation)
Trinity Bible College & Graduate School, Ellendale, North Dakota (A.A., B.A., M.A.) (North Central Association of Colleges and Schools; A.B.H.E., Professional Accreditation)
Western Bible College, Phoenix, Arizona (A.A., B.A.)

Liberal arts
American Indian College, Phoenix, Arizona (A.A., B.A.) (N.C.A.C.S., Regional Accreditation)
Evangel University, Springfield, Missouri (A.A., B.A., B.B.A., B.F.A., B.M., B.S., B.S.W., M.A., M.Ed., M.S.) (N.C.A.C.S., Regional Accreditation)
North Central University, Minneapolis, Minnesota (A.A., B.A., B.S., MA) (N.C.A.C.S., Regional Accreditation)
Northwest University, Kirkland, Washington (A.A., B.A., B.F.A., B.M., B.S., M.A., M.B.A., MIT., M. ED., Psy. D.) (N.W.C.C.U., Regional Accreditation)
Southeastern University, Lakeland, Florida (A.A., B.A., B.S., B.S.W., M.A., M.B.A., M.Ed., Ed.D., D.Min.) (S.A.C.S., Regional Accreditation)
Southwestern Assemblies of God University, Waxahachie, Texas (A.A., B.A., B.S., M.A., M.Div., M.Ed., M.S., D.Min.) (S.A.C.S., Regional Accreditation)
University of Valley Forge, Phoenixville, Pennsylvania (A.A., B.A., B.S.) (M.S.A.C.S., Regional Accreditation)
Vanguard University of Southern California, Costa Mesa, California (B.A., B.S., M.A., M.B.A., M.S.) (W.A.S.C., Regional Accreditation)

Distance education
Global University, Springfield, Missouri (A.A., B.A., M.A., M.Div., D.Min.) (N.C.A.C.S., Regional Accreditation)
Southwestern Assemblies of God University, Waxahachie, Texas (A.A., B.A., B.S., M.A., M.Div., M.Ed., M.S.) (S.A.C.S., Regional Accreditation)
Vanguard University of Southern California, Costa Mesa, California (B.A., B.S., M.A., M.B.A., M.S.) (W.A.S.C., Regional Accreditation)

Seminary
Assemblies of God Theological Seminary, Springfield, Missouri (M.A., M.Div., D.Min.) (N.C.A.C.S., Regional Accreditation; A.T.S., Professional Accreditation)

Student ministry
Chi Alpha Campus Ministries

South America

Brazil
 Instituto Bíblico das Assembleias de Deus (IBAD), Pindamonhangaba, São Paulo

Venezuela
 Seminario Evangélico Pentecostal de las Asambleas de Dios - SEPAD (antes Instituto Bíblico Central - IBC), Barquisimeto, Estado Lara.

Asia

India
Bethel Bible College, Punalur, Kerala
Southern Asia Bible College, Bangalore, Karnataka
Assemblies of God Tamil Nadu Bible College, Madurai, Tamil Nadu

Indonesia
Sekolah Tinggi Teologi Satyabhakti, Malang, Indonesia
Sekolah Pekerja Kristus-SPK, Surabaya, Indonesia
Pusat Pelatihan Misi Waisango, Halmahera Timur, Indonesia

Japan
Central Bible College, Tokyo, Japan

Hong Kong
Ecclesia Bible College, Hong Kong, China
Ecclesia Theological Seminary, Hong Kong, China
Synergy Institute of Leadership, Hong Kong, China

Taiwan
Assemblies of God School of Theology, Taichung, Taiwan

Malaysia
Bible College of Malaysia, Petaling Jaya, Malaysia
Malaysia Tamil Bible Institute, Nilai, Negeri Sembilan, Malaysia

Philippines
Asia Pacific Theological Seminary, Baguio, Philippines
Assemblies of God School of Ministry, Cainta, Rizal, Philippines
Bethel Bible College (Philippines)|Bethel Bible College, Valenzuela, Philippines
Evangel Bible College, Daraga, Albay, Philippines
Luzon Bible College, Binalonan, Pangasinan, Philippines

Singapore
Assemblies of God Bible College, Singapore
TCA College, Singapore

Myanmar
Immanuel Bible College, Pyin Oo Lwin Myo, Myanmar

Australia
Schools affiliated with the Australian Christian Churches, the Assemblies of God in Australia:
Alphacrucis, Sydney, New South Wales
Harvest Bible College, Melbourne, Victoria
Hillsong International Leadership College, Sydney, New South Wales
Planetshakers College, Melbourne, Victoria
Brisbane Christian College, Brisbane, Queensland
Northside Christian College, Brisbane, Queensland
Calvary Christian College, Townsville, Queensland

Europe

Belgium
Continental Theological Seminary, Sint-Pieters-Leeuw, Belgium

Portugal
Monte Esperança Instituto Bíblico das Assembleias de Deus, Loures, Portugal

France
L'Institut de Théologie Biblique des Assemblées de Dieu de France
Global University France

United Kingdom
Mattersey Hall, Mattersey, United Kingdom

Africa

Kenya

University
Kenya Assemblies of God East Africa School of Theology University (KAG EAST University), Nairobi

Bible School
Kenya Assemblies of God Extension (KAGE), Most part of the country

Nigeria

Bible and Theological
 Assemblies of God Divinity School, Old Umuahia
 Western Bible College, Iperu

Seminary
 Bethel Seminary, Nekede, Owerri
 Assemblies of God Seminary, Igoli, Ogoja

University
 Evangel University, Akaeze

Togo

Bible and Theological
 West Africa Advanced School of Theology, Lomé

Congo Democratic

Bible
[Institut Biblique et Théologique des Assemblées de Dieu, IBTAD], Kinshasa

Theological
 [Faculté Théologique des Assemblées de Dieu, FATAD], Kinshasa

Tanzania Republic

Bible and Theological
African Continent Theological Seminary, Dodoma
Central Bible College, Dodoma
Global Harvest Bible College, Dar es salaam

References

Assemblies of God-related lists
Lists of Christian universities and colleges